Philedonides seeboldiana is a species of moth of the family Tortricidae. It is found in Portugal and Spain.

The wingspan is 13–14 mm. Adults are on wing from February to March.

The larvae feed on Ulex parviflorus.

References

External links
Lepiforum.de

Moths described in 1877
Archipini